Carposinidae, the "fruitworm moths", is a family of insects in the order Lepidoptera. These moths are narrower winged than Copromorphidae, with less rounded forewing tips. Males often have conspicuous patches of scales on either surface (Dugdale et al., 1999). The mouthparts are quite diagnostic, usually with prominent, upcurved "labial palps", the third segment long (especially in females), and the second segment covered in large scales. Unlike Copromorphidae, the "M2" and sometimes "M1" vein on the hindwings is absent. The relationship of Carposinidae relative to Copromorphidae needs further investigation. It is considered possible that the family is artificial, being nested within Copromorphidae (Dugdale et al., 1999). The Palearctic species have been revised by Alexey Diakonoff (1989).

Distribution
Carposinidae occur worldwide except the north-western Palearctic region (Dugdale et al., 1999).

Behaviour
Adults are greenish or greyish, with camouflage patterns, night flying and attracted to lights. Caterpillars live within leaves, flowers, fruits or buds, or also in galls within plant tissue. The larvae pupate with the larval shelter or descend to the ground and make a cocoon covered in detritus (Dugdale et al., 1999).

Larval host plants
The caterpillars feed on the gymnosperm family Podocarpaceae as well as the dicotyledon plant families Asteraceae, Campanulaceae, Ericaceae, Fagaceae, Myrtaceae, Rosaceae, Proteaceae and Rutaceae (Dugdale et al., 1999). As the moths can infest fruit some are considered pest species such as the peach fruit moth (Center for Invasive Species and Ecosystem Health, n.d.).

References

Davis, D.R. (1968). A revision of the American moths of the family Carposinidae (Lepidoptera: Carposinoidea). Bulletin of the United States National Museum 289: 1–105.
Diakonoff, A., (1989). Revision of the Palaearctic Carposinidae with description of a new genus and new species (Lepidoptera: Pyraloidea). Zoölogische Verhandelingen. 251: 1–155.
Dugdale, J.S., Kristensen, N.P., Robinson, G.S. and Scoble, M.J. (1999) [1998]. The smaller microlepidoptera grade superfamilies,  Ch.13., pp. 217–232 in Kristensen, N.P. (Ed.). Lepidoptera, Moths and Butterflies. Volume 1: Evolution, Systematics, and Biogeography. Handbuch der Zoologie. Eine Naturgeschichte der Stämme des Tierreiches / Handbook of Zoology. A Natural History of the phyla of the Animal Kingdom. Band / Volume IV Arthropoda: Insecta Teilband / Part 35: 491 pp. Walter de Gruyter, Berlin, New York.

External links
Tree of Life
LepIndex list of species and genera in family Carposinidae
Fauna Europaea Experts
Lepidoptera of Tasmania
Chinese Carposinidae
Heterogyma ochrogamma
Ctenarchis pdf